Sabah People's Hope Party or  (Harapan Rakyat / HR ) is a Sabah-based party.

The party was formed on 25 October 2016, founded by Lajim Ukin. It was previously a party in the alliance of United Sabah Alliance (USA) from 2017 until 2018. In 2019, Harapan Rakyat planned and was supposed to hold an extraordinary general meeting (EGM) to dissolve the party and absorb its 64,000 members into Malaysian United Indigenous Party (BERSATU) at the launch of the party's Sabah chapter on 6 April 2019 in Kota Kinabalu.

Somehow the dissolution was deferred and registration of party was left to remains dormant until it was revived and reestablished again ahead of the September 2020 Sabah state election which allowed the party led by new president, Liew Yun Fah to participate in the snap polls.

Elected representatives

Dewan Undangan Negeri (State Legislative Assembly) 

Sabah State Legislative Assembly

General election results

See also 
 Politics of Malaysia
 List of political parties in Malaysia

References

External links 

Political parties in Sabah
2016 establishments in Malaysia
Political parties established in 2016